At least two ships of the Royal Navy have been named HMS Heliotrope  after the genus of flower.

  was an  launched in 1915 and sold for scrapping in 1935.
  was a  launched in 1940 and transferred to the United States in 1942 as USS Surprise, returned to the Royal Navy in 1945 she was sold into mercantile service as Heliolock in 1946.

Royal Navy ship names